Didier Menard (born 26 September 1972) is a retired American-born Haitian football goalkeeper.

Born in New York, his parents split when he was a year old. His mother moved to Orlando, but for a time Menard was raised by other relatives in Montreal. Moving back to Orlando, Menard made his way into the local team Cocoa Expos.

In 1995, Norwegian team Tromsø IL saw their goalkeeper and team captain Tor Andre Grenersen sustain an injury. Menard was signed on a short-term basis to compete with Tromsø's then-reserve goalkeeper Thomas Tøllefsen. Menard made his Tromsø debut in the 1995 UEFA Intertoto Cup as a 55th-minute substitute for Tøllefsen away against FC Universitatea Cluj. He was the first black goalkeeper in Norwegian top-flight football. However, Grenersen returned from injury before Menard got to play any league games, and Menard was sent back to the US.

In 1999 and 2000 Menard represented Haiti and won 7 international caps.

References

1972 births
Living people
People from New York City
American expatriates in Canada
American soccer players
American expatriate soccer players
Expatriate footballers in Norway
American expatriate sportspeople in Norway
Tromsø IL players
Haitian footballers
Haiti international footballers
Association football goalkeepers